Bhagalpur Municipal Corporation is the municipal corporation governing Indian city of Bhagalpur. Municipal Corporation mechanism in India was introduced during British Rule with formation of municipal corporation in Madras (Chennai) in 1688, later followed by municipal corporations in Bombay (Mumbai) and Calcutta (Kolkata) by 1762. Bhagalpur Municipal Corporation is headed by Mayor of city and governed by Commissioner.

History and administration 

Bhagalpur Municipal Corporation was formed in 1981 to improve the infrastructure of the town as per the needs of local population. Bhagalpur Municipal Corporation  has been categorised into 51 wards and each ward is headed by councillor for which elections are held every 5 years.

Bhagalpur Municipal Corporation is governed by mayor Dr. Basundhara Lal(BJP) and administered by Municipal Commissioner Yogesh Kumar Sagar(IAS).

Functions 
Bhagalpur Municipal Corporation is created for the following functions:

 Planning for the town including its surroundings which are covered under its Department's Urban Planning Authority .
 Approving construction of new buildings and authorising use of land for various purposes.
 Improvement of the town's economic and Social status.
 Arrangements of water supply towards commercial, residential and industrial purposes.
 Planning for fire contingencies through Fire Service Departments.
 Creation of solid waste management, public health system and sanitary services.
 Working for the development of ecological aspect like development of Urban Forestry and making guidelines for environmental protection.
 Working for the development of weaker sections of the society like mentally and physically handicapped, old age and gender biased people.
 Making efforts for improvement of slums and poverty removal in the town.

Revenue 
The following are the Income sources for the Corporation from the Central and State Government

Revenue from taxes  
Following is the Tax related revenue for the corporation:
 Property tax
 Profession tax
 Entertainment tax
 Grants from Central and State Government like Goods and Services Tax
 Advertisement tax

Revenue from non-tax sources 
Following is the Non Tax related revenue for the corporation:
 Water usage charges
 Fees from Documentation services
 Rent received from municipal property
 Funds from municipal bonds

See also 
 List of municipal corporations in India

References

External links 

Bhagalpur
Municipal corporations in Bihar